Philip Ashton Smithells (12 April 1910 – 13 January 1977) was a New Zealand physical educationalist and university professor.

He was born in Leeds, Yorkshire, England in 1910, the son of the  British chemist Arthur Smithells. He received his education at Bedales School and at Clare College of the University of Cambridge. He became a lecturer in physical education at the University of Otago. He lived in Wanganui during his retirement, where he died on 13 January 1977. He was survived by his second wife, Olive Smithells, his two daughters from his first marriage, and his three sons from his second marriage.

References

1910 births
1977 deaths
English emigrants to New Zealand
People educated at Bedales School
Alumni of Clare College, Cambridge
Academic staff of the University of Otago